The Luxembourg Internet eXchange (stylised as LU-CIX) is a carrier and neutral internet exchange point (IX) located in Luxembourg.

History
LU-CIX was founded in February 2009 under the initiative on cross-industry players. 

LU-CIX gathers together national and international telecommunications operators, data centre operators, ISPs and online businesses.

LU-CIX is a member of Euro-IX (European Internet Exchange Association).

Infrastructure
LU-CIX is hosted in 8 data centers, PoPs, across the country to facilitate the membership of a majority of Internet related players.

The traffic peak of LU-CIX is 320,3 Gbps.

It also leverages strong partnerships with other IX in Europe (ECIX & FranceIX).

References

Internet exchange points in Luxembourg